Dame Nicola Mary Brewer  (born 14 November 1957) is a former British diplomat and university administrator.  From 2014 to 2020, she was Vice-Provost (International) at University College London, she was British High Commissioner to South Africa from 2009 to 2013, and the first Chief Executive of Britain's Equality and Human Rights Commission from 2007 to 2009.

Education
Brewer was educated at the Belfast Royal Academy, and read English at the University of Leeds, graduating with a Bachelor of Arts in 1980, then taking a Doctorate in linguistics in 1988 there.

Career
Brewer joined the Foreign and Commonwealth Office (FCO) in 1983, completing overseas postings in South Africa, India, France and Mexico. She served as the FCO's Director for Global Issues from 2001 to 2002, and then as Director-General for Regional Programmes at the Department for International Development (DfID), the DfID board member supervising the UK's overseas bilateral aid programmes.

In December 2006, Brewer was appointed by open competition as the first Chief Executive of the newly established Equality and Human Rights Commission, the successor body to the Commission for Racial Equality, the Disability Rights Commission and the Equal Opportunities Commission.

In May 2014, she was appointed Vice-Provost (International) at University College London, standing down in 2020.

Other activities
 Iberdrola, Independent Member of the Board of Directors (since 2020)
 Weir Group, Independent Member of the Board of Directors (since 2022)

Brewer is also a member of the Trilateral Commission. From 2021 to 2022, she was a member of the Trilateral Commission’s Task Force on Global Capitalism in Transition, chaired by Carl Bildt, Kelly Grier and Takeshi Niinami.

Recognition
Brewer was appointed Companion of the Order of St Michael and St George (CMG) in the 2003 New Year Honours and Dame Commander of the Order of St Michael and St George (DCMG) in the 2011 Birthday Honours. The University of Leeds awarded her an honorary Doctorate of Laws in 2009. She was appointed Chevalier, Légion d'honneur in 2022.

Personal life
Brewer is married to former diplomat Geoffrey Gillham; they have two children. Her father, Trevor Brewer, played international rugby for Wales in the 1950s.

References

1957 births
Living people
People educated at the Belfast Royal Academy
British women ambassadors
Ambassadors and High Commissioners of the United Kingdom to South Africa
High Commissioners of the United Kingdom to Eswatini
High Commissioners of the United Kingdom to Lesotho
Dames Commander of the Order of St Michael and St George
Place of birth missing (living people)